James David Cruickshank (born June 10, 1936; died December 30, 2015) was bishop of Cariboo from 1992 to 2001.

Cruickshank was educated at the University of Minnesota and ordained in 1963. He served in the Robson Valley area until 1965 when he became director of the Anglican Lay Training Centre at Sorrento. In 1983 he became dean of New Westminster, a post he held until his election as Bishop of Cariboo.

External links 
 Former bishop of Cariboo James Cruickshank dies
 https://www.anglican.ca/news/tribute-to-a-friend/30013891/amp/

References

University of Minnesota alumni
Deans of New Westminster
Anglican bishops of Cariboo
1936 births
2015 deaths